Štefan Robač (born 27 July 1931) is a Slovenian cross-country skier. He competed in the men's 30 kilometre event at the 1956 Winter Olympics.

References

1931 births
Living people
Slovenian male cross-country skiers
Olympic cross-country skiers of Yugoslavia
Cross-country skiers at the 1956 Winter Olympics
People from Ravne na Koroškem